Alcoy, officially the Municipality of Alcoy,  is a 5th class municipality in the province of Cebu, Philippines. According to the 2020 census, it has a population of 19,186 people.

It is named after Alcoy in Spain.

History

Spanish colonization

The old town of Alcoy, located in the current barangay of Daanlungsod, known as Mambaje, becomes one of the visitas of Carcar in 1690.  Mambaje is absorbed as a barrio of Boljoon in 1692. The church in Alcoy and three Bantayan sa Hari or watchtowers are built. The settlers choose Sta. Rosa de Lima as their patron saint. 

A creation of the town of Mambaje was proposed. On July 16, 1866, Mambaje becomes a municipality. A year after, the first formal school opened in Alcoy, according to the Spanish Organic Law of 1863. In 1869, Mambaje was renamed to Alcoy. The seat of local government or the poblacion was moved from Mambaje to Hulomaynon (now Poblacion). In 1890, the town of Alcoy ranks first in production of coffee and sixth in cotton in the province of Cebu. Then in 1898, Alcoy joins the Anti-Spanish Uprising.

American and Japanese period

In 1899, Alcoy, and the rest of the Philippines, is occupied by the Americans. Resistance against the new colonizers in Cebu ceased in 1901.  The town experienced a smallpox and cholera epidemic in 1903. Between 1904 to 1916, Alcoy is merged to the town of Dalaguete. Herminigildo Mosqueda becomes Alcoy’s first elected mayor after he wins the local elections in 1928. 

During World War II, Hilario de los Santos organizes and heads the local guerilla resistance against the Japanese in Alcoy. The Civil Affairs unit is formed at Nug-as with former Mayor Herminigildo Mosquedo as president.

Post-independence

The Philippines became independent from the United States in July 4, 1946. On November 11, 1947, Pedro Romanos is the first elected mayor of Alcoy in the post-war era. In 1971, Catalino de los Santos is elected mayor and remained in office during the Martial Law period until the EDSA Revolution in 1986. The Dolomite Mining Corporation is established in 1980.

Contemporary

Eusebio Sestoso becomes the elected mayor of Alcoy after the EDSA Revolution in 1988. During the administration of Antonio Plando, the Siloy Festival is launched in 2005. Michael Angelo Sestoso wins the mayoralty election in 2016.

Geography

It is bordered to the north by the town of Dalaguete, to the west is the town of Alegria, to the east is the Cebu Strait, and to the south is the town of Boljoon.

Barangays

Alcoy comprises 8 barangays:

Daan-Lungsod and Guiwang

Daan-Lungsod, formerly known as Mambaje, is the southernmost barangay of Alcoy. Tingko Beach is located partly in this small barangay and partly in Guiwang. A fiesta is held in Daan-Lungsod every 3 May in honor of Santa Cruz. There is a reef called Mabad-on which appears during low tide, and is completely submerged during high tide. Mabad-on is listed as Mambahi Reef in the Philippine maritime and navigation map.

The elementary school is located in Guiwang. Guiwang celebrates 13 June the feast day of Saint Anthony of Padua.

Two baluwarti (watchtowers) still stand in the two barangays. The watchtowers are the oldest-surviving structures in Alcoy and they are reminders of the Spanish occupation of Cebu Island. They were used to warn the locals that pirates were coming. Originally a settlement of Dalaguete, it was founded by the Spaniards in 1880 and was developed into a stop-over station for priests going to Dalaguete. In 1869, via a royal decree, Mambaje became a municipality and was renamed to Alcoy, after a city in Spain.

Poblacion

The Poblacion is the principal barangay of Alcoy. It is where the main facilities of the town are located: the municipal government center, police station, and main health center.

Pugalo

The country's largest dolomite quarry is mined in Pugalo.

Climate

Tourist attractions

Alcoy's Nug-as forest is the last rainforest of Cebu. It borders the town of Argao and is connected to the town's Lantoy Mountain. It is the home of the Black Shama (Copsychus Cebuensis), a local species of song bird in the family Muscicapidae that is only found in Cebu, where it is known locally as "Siloy".

The Siloy Festival is Alcoy's nature festival and eco-tourism project. It is in honor of St. Rose of Lima. The festival takes its name from the local term of the Black Shama. The festival is a project meant to promote awareness of the Black Shama and its endangered nature and to help preserve Cebu's endemic Shama species of birds, as well to help save Mother Earth. It is celebrated on 23 August every year.

Demographics

Economy

Alcoy is mainly an agricultural town with Nugas, a mountain barangay, more than half of commercial crops. The rest of the communities rely on subsistence fishing and backyard farming. The country's largest dolomite quarry is mined in Pugalo. Beaches are located in Guiwang and Daanlungsod.

References

External links

 [ Philippine Standard Geographic Code]

Municipalities of Cebu